Tristraguloolithus is an oogenus of dinosaur egg from the late Campanian of Alberta.

See also

 List of dinosaur oogenera

References

Dinosaur reproduction
Fossil parataxa described in 1996